Pekka Karjalainen is a Finnish film director and sound producer.  He won the Jussi Award in the category of Best Sound Design for his work on 2001's Joki.

Filmography  

Hysteria, (1993)
Minäkin rakastan sinua, (TV) (1998) 
Silmä silmästä (1999)
Minä, joki ja metsä, (TV) (2000)
Liekki, (TV) (2002)
Beatlehem, (TV) (2003)
Kummelin jackpot, (2006)
Matchen (Short), (2018)
Arno (Documentary Short), (2019)
All the Sins (TV Series), (2019)

References

External links
 Hysteria
 

Living people
Finnish film directors
Year of birth missing (living people)